Garcia V (died 1830) was ruler (Manikongo) of the Kingdom of Kongo from 1803 until January 1830. He returned the Kingdom of Kongo to the rule of the Água Rosada dynasty, founded by Pedro IV, after a number of Kinlaza kings.

References

1830 deaths
Manikongo of Kongo
Year of birth unknown